Hugh McDowell (17 November 1907 – March 1972) was an English professional rugby league footballer who played in the 1930s and 1940s.

Playing career

International honours
Hugh McDowell won a cap for England while at Widnes in 1939 against France.

County Cup Final appearances
Hugh McDowell played left-, i.e. number 11, in Widnes' 4–5 defeat by Swinton in the 1939–40 Lancashire County Cup Final first-leg during the 1939–40 season at Naughton Park, Widnes on Saturday 20 April 1940, and played left- in the 11–16 defeat (15–21 aggregate defeat) by Swinton in the 1939–40 Lancashire County Cup Final second-leg during the 1939–40 season at Station Road, Swinton on Saturday 27 April 1940, and played right-, i.e. number 10, in Widnes' 7–3 victory over Wigan in the 1945–46 Lancashire County Cup Final during the 1945–46 season at Wilderspool Stadium, Warrington on Saturday 27 October 1945.

References

External links
Statistics at rugby.widnes.tv

1907 births
1972 deaths
England national rugby league team players
English rugby league players
Place of birth missing
Place of death missing
Rugby league props
Rugby league second-rows
St Helens R.F.C. players
Widnes Vikings players